Alejandro Félix Montiel (born 24 April 1971) is a Mexican professional boxer and a former IBA flyweight champion. He is a cousin of former world champion Fernando Montiel.

Professional career
In May 2001, Montiel beat the WBO flyweight champion Ruben Sánchez León, to win the IBA flyweight title.

See also
Notable boxing families

References

External links

Boxers from Sinaloa
Sportspeople from Los Mochis
Super-bantamweight boxers
1971 births
Living people
Mexican male boxers